Oliver G J T. Jager (born 5 July 1995) is a rugby union player who currently plays as a prop for  in New Zealand's domestic Mitre 10 Cup and for the  in the international Super Rugby competition. He is often known as the Flying Bull.

Early career

Born in London, Jager attended Newbridge College in Kildare & Blackrock College in Dublin, where his father, Harm Jager, was a strength and conditioning coach. Harm previously represented the Netherlands men's national water polo team. Jager travelled to New Zealand in 2013 to attend the Crusaders International High Performance Unit and subsequently turned out for the Crusaders Academy and the Crusaders Knights development team. During this time he also started playing club rugby in the Canterbury area with New Brighton RFC

Senior career

Jager's dedication in coming to New Zealand in order to further his rugby career paid off in 2016, when great form at club level saw him named in the Canterbury squad for the Mitre 10 Cup.  With the Cantabrians already possessing Super Rugby props in the shape of Alex Hodgman, Siate Tokolahi and Daniel Lienert-Brown, Jager's appearances in his first season were largely limited to cameos from the replacements bench.   He started once and came on as a replacement seven times as his side lifted the Premiership trophy for the 8th time in 9 seasons.

Super Rugby

His debut season at provincial level saw him coached by Canterbury legend Scott Robertson and like his coach, Jager found himself promoted to Super Rugby level in 2017, earning a contract with the Crusaders.

References

External link
 
Crusaders Profile

1995 births
Living people
People educated at Blackrock College
Irish rugby union players
Rugby union props
Canterbury rugby union players
Crusaders (rugby union) players
Irish expatriate rugby union players
Irish expatriate sportspeople in New Zealand
Expatriate rugby union players in New Zealand
Irish people of Dutch descent